Lago del Tafone is a lake in the Province of Grosseto, Tuscany, Italy. It is located between the Albegna and Fiora hills and the Maremma, downstream from the Rocca di Montauto and not far from the border with Lazio. Since 1996, it has been partially included in the protected areas of the Montauto nature reserve.

See also 

 Manciano
 Montauto nature reserve
 Maremma
 Albegna and Fiora hills
 Geography of Tuscany

Lakes of Tuscany
Manciano